Ezequiel Damián Cacace (born January 7, 1984) is an Argentine football goalkeeper who currently plays for Talleres de Escalada.

External links

1984 births
Living people
Argentine footballers
Argentine expatriate footballers
Talleres de Remedios de Escalada footballers
Club Atlético Vélez Sarsfield footballers
Rangers de Talca footballers
Cobreloa footballers
Expatriate footballers in Chile
Association football goalkeepers
Footballers from Buenos Aires